Lena Möller (born 17 April 1957) is a Swedish sprinter. She competed in the women's 4 × 100 metres relay at the 1980 Summer Olympics.

References

External links
 

1957 births
Living people
Athletes (track and field) at the 1980 Summer Olympics
Swedish female sprinters
Olympic athletes of Sweden
Place of birth missing (living people)
Olympic female sprinters